Govijeh (also Romanized as Govījeh and Gūyjeh; also known as Gowjeh and Gujja) is a village in Agahan Rural District, Kolyai District, Sonqor County, Kermanshah Province, Iran. At the 2006 census, its population was 35, in 11 families.

References 

Populated places in Sonqor County